Thomas Richardson House is a historic home located at Ilion in Herkimer County, New York. It was built around 1873, and is a brick structure with an asymmetrical rectangular plan in the Italianate style.  The two-story main block has a hipped roof and 3 two-story projecting bays with clipped gable roofs covered in slate. It features a three-story tower with a two-tiered, concave mansard roof.  The property includes the original carriage house and landscaping.

It was listed on the National Register of Historic Places in 1984.

It is now owned by YouTube and Netflix personality Christine McConnell.

References

Washington Post, Realestate: Historic houses for sale across the country

Houses on the National Register of Historic Places in New York (state)
Italianate architecture in New York (state)
Houses completed in 1873
Houses in Herkimer County, New York
National Register of Historic Places in Herkimer County, New York